Statistics of the USL D3 Pro League for the 2002 season.

League standings

Northern Conference

Atlantic Conference

Southern Conference

Western Conference

Playoffs
First Round:
 San Diego defeated Arizona, 3-0.
 Carolina defeated Greenville, 1-0.
Quarterfinals:
 Long Island defeated New York 2-2 (5-4 PK)
 Connecticut defeated Western Massachusetts 0-2, 3-2
 Wilmington defeated Carolina 2-1
 Utah defeated San Diego 1-0
Semifinals:
 Wilmington defeated Utah 3-1
 Long Island defeated Connecticut 3-0
FINAL:
 Long Island defeated Wilmington 2-1

References

3
2002